= Delphine Bertholon =

French writer and screenwriter

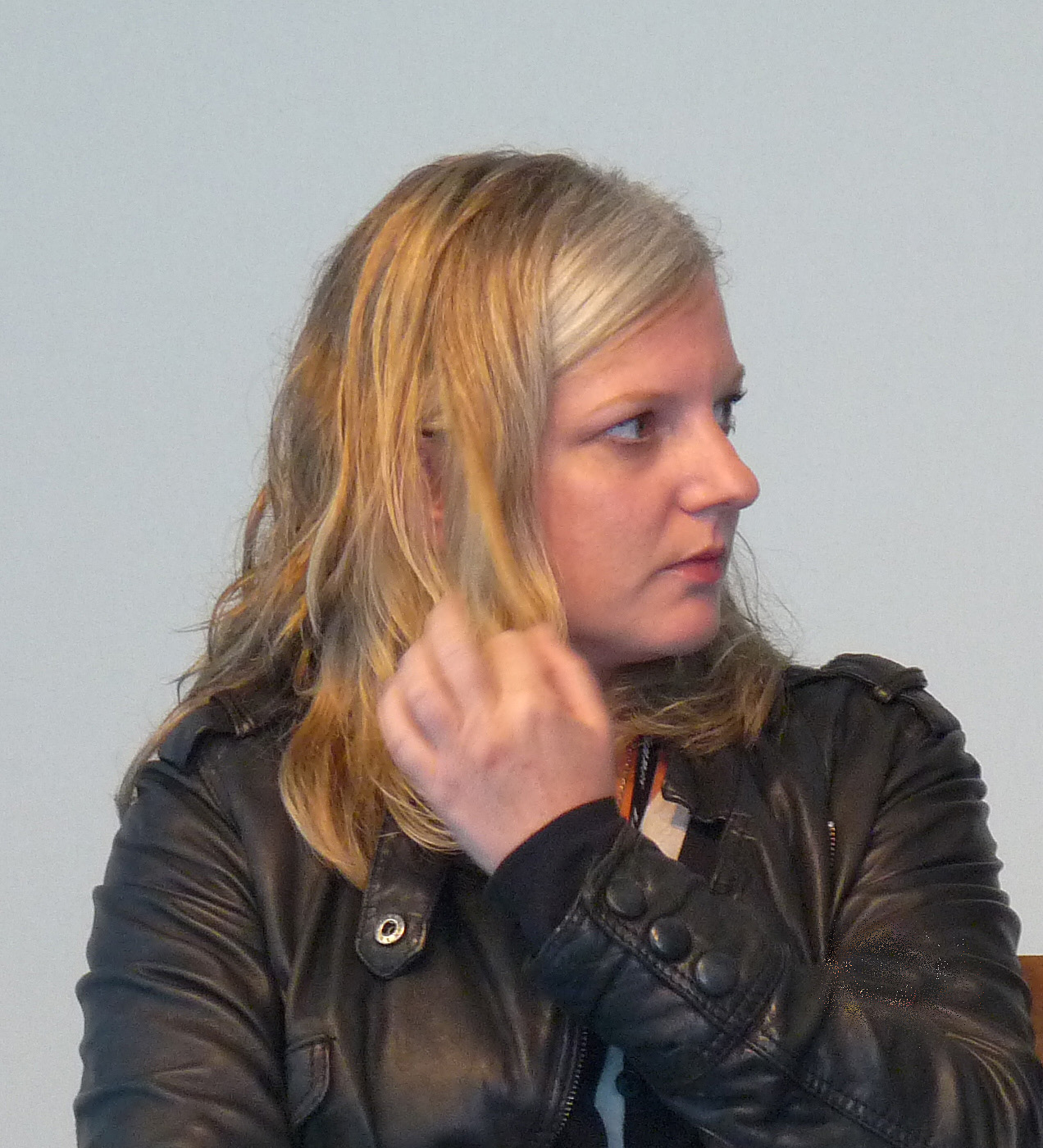
Delphine Bertholon, 2012

Delphine Bertholon (Lyon, 1976) is a French writer and screenwriter. She lives currently in Paris and works as a screenwriter.

== Publications ==
- Les Dentelles Mortes, 1998
- Cabine commune, 2007
- Twist, 2008
- L’Effet Larsen, 2010
- Ma vie en noir et blanc, 2011
- Grâce, 2012
- Le Soleil à mes pieds, 2013
- Les Corps inutiles, 2015
- Cœur-Naufrage, 2017
- Celle qui marche la nuit, 2017/18
